Abercarn United Football Club is a Welsh football team based in Abercarn, Caerphilly county borough, Wales.  The team currently play in the Gwent County League Premier Division, which is at the fourth tier of the Welsh football league system.

History
The club was formed in 1997 via the merger of Abercarn Town and Abercarn Rangers. They have played in the top tier of the Gwent County League since and their best league performance since has been third place in 2018–19.

External links
Official Club twitter
Official Club Facebook

References

Football clubs in Wales
Gwent County League clubs
Association football clubs established in 1997
1997 establishments in Wales